Andrew Gino Lumsden  (born 22 January 1947) is an English neurobiologist, Emeritus Professor of the University of London and founder in 2000 of the Medical Research Council Centre for Developmental Neurobiology at King's College London.

Education
Andrew Lumsden attended Kingswood School in Bath, Somerset (as Andrew Sita-Lumsden) and graduated from St. Catharine's College, Cambridge with Double First Class Honours in Natural Sciences. After visiting Yale University for two years as a Fulbright Scholar, he returned to England to complete his PhD in Developmental Biology at the University of London.

Career and research
Lumsden has held various lectureships at Guy's Hospital Medical School and the United Medical Schools of Guy's and St. Thomas' Hospital before being made a full Professor of the University of London in 1989.  He has been an International Scholar of the Howard Hughes Medical Institute (1993–1998) and a Miller Institute visiting professor at the University of California, Berkeley (1994).

Lumsden has served on the Medical Research Council Neurosciences and Mental Health Board and Grants Committee (1992—1998), the Wellcome Trust Neuroscience Funding Committee (1997—2000), and the Brain Functions Grant Review Committee of the Human Frontier Science Program (1998—2001). He has also served as editor of Development (1995—2007) and is co-founder of the on-line, open-access journal Neural Development. In addition, Andrew Lumsden is a co-Head of Section for Faculty of 1000.

Andrew Lumsden has co-authored a book entitled The Developing Brain with Michael Brown and Roger Keynes. Following his PhD on epithelial-mesenchymal interactions in mammalian development, Lumsden's interest moved to the question of how integumental structures, such as teeth and vibrissae acquire their nerve supply, and how the cranial neural crest contributes to their patterning. Studies on the development of the trigeminal nerve and ganglion led on to observations of the organisation of their corresponding motor and sensory regions of the central nervous system.  His seminal observations and experiments on the developing hindbrain of mammal and bird embryos confirmed the long suggested but never agreed view that this brain region has a rigidly segmented organisation, much like the body plan of insects and worms. To assist his research, he developed the Lumsden BioScissors™. Most recently, he has focussed on the developing forebrain, where he discovered signalling properties in a small set of cells that pattern the large surrounding region of the thalamus.

Awards and honours
Lumsden was elected a Fellow of the Royal Society (elected 1994), a Fellow of the Academy of Medical Sciences (1998), and a Fellow of King's College London (1999). He was also elected an EMBO Member in 2008.

In 2001, he was awarded The Ferrier Lecture and medal by the Royal Society and in 2007, the W. Maxwell Cowan Prize for "outstanding contributions in developmental neuroscience".

Lumsden has also been elected Freeman of the Worshipful Company of Clockmakers in 2006, and raised to the Livery in 2016.

Publications 
Lumsden's publications include:

References 

Fellows of the Royal Society
1947 births
Living people
Alumni of St Catharine's College, Cambridge
British neuroscientists
Fellows of King's College London
Academics of the University of London
Members of the European Molecular Biology Organization
Academics of King's College London
Fellows of the Academy of Medical Sciences (United Kingdom)